The 17th Senate District of Wisconsin is one of 33 districts in the Wisconsin State Senate.  Located in southwest Wisconsin, the district comprises all of Grant, Lafayette, Juneau, and Richland counties, as well as most of Sauk County, western Iowa County, southwest Green County, and parts of eastern Vernon County.

Current elected officials
Howard Marklein is the senator representing the 17th district. He was first elected in the 2014 general election, and is now in his second four-year term.  Before serving as senator, he was a member of the Wisconsin State Assembly from 2011 to 2015, representing the 51st Assembly district.

Each Wisconsin State Senate district is composed of three Wisconsin State Assembly districts.  The 17th Senate district comprises the 49th, 50th, and 51st Assembly districts.  The current representatives of those districts are:
 Assembly District 49: Travis Tranel (R–Cuba City)
 Assembly District 50: Tony Kurtz (R–Wonewoc)
 Assembly District 51: Todd Novak (R–Dodgeville)

The 17th Senate district, in its current borders, crosses three different congressional districts.  Iowa, Sauk, and Lafayette counties, as well as the southeast corner of Richland County fall within Wisconsin's 2nd congressional district, which is represented by U.S. Representative Mark Pocan; northern Juneau County falls within Wisconsin's 7th congressional district, represented by U.S. Representative Tom Tiffany; the remainder of Juneau County, along with Grant County, the remainder of Richland County, and the portions of Vernon and Monroe counties within the 17th Senate district fall within Wisconsin's 3rd congressional district, which is represented by U.S. Representative Ron Kind.

History
The 17th Senate district was one of the original 19 Senate districts when Wisconsin was established as a U.S. state.  The 17th district was defined in Article XIV, Section 12 of the Wisconsin Constitution as "The towns of Racine, Caledonia, Mount Pleasant, Raymond, Norway, Rochester, Yorkville, and Burlington, in the county of Racine".  At that time, this list of towns constituted the northern half of Racine County, but after the establishment of Kenosha County in 1850, this collection of towns would constitute the entire territory of Racine County.  During these years, the Free Soil Party was established as a splinter faction of the Democratic Party, and Racine County was a center of Free Soil power in the state of Wisconsin.

In 1852, the Wisconsin Legislature passed a reapportionment which expanded the Senate to 25 seats.  The act redefined the 17th Senate district as "The towns of Janesville, Rock, Fulton, Porter, Centre, Plymouth, Newark, Avon, Spring Valley, Magnolia, and Union, in the county of Rock".  This constituted the western half of Rock County.  The 1856 redistricting, which expanded the Senate to 30 seats, reiterated the existing boundaries for the 17th district, but noted the addition of the city of Janesville, which was incorporated in 1853.  The 1861 redistricting act, which expanded the Senate to its current number of 33 senators, expanded the 17th district to cover all of Rock County.

The district boundaries remained unchanged until 1892, when a controversial redistricting act was passed just days before the 1892 election.  The new boundaries of the 17th district were defined as "The county of Green and the towns of Union, Porter, Magnolia, Center, Spring Valley, Plymouth, Avon, Newark, Beloit and the Third and Fourth wards of the city of Beloit, in the county of Rock, and the towns of Cottage Grove, Deerfield, Pleasant Springs, Dunkirk, Dunn, Rutland, Christiana, Albion and the city of Stoughton, in the county of Dane".  Simplified, this constituted all of Green County, western Rock County, and southeast Dane County.

The 1892 act was quickly superseded by an 1896 act, which redefined the 17th Senate district as "Green and Lafayette counties, and the towns of Avon, Beloit, Clinton, Newark, Plymouth, Spring Valley, Turtle, and the village of Clinton, and the city of Beloit, in the county of Rock."  The list of towns in Rock county constituted roughly the southern half of the county.  This act was, in turn, superseded by the 1901 redistricting act which removed Rock County from the district entirely, and added Iowa County to Green and Lafayette.

In 1951, after several decades without redistricting, the Wisconsin Legislature passed the so-called Rosenberry plan, named for retired Wisconsin Supreme Court justice Marvin B. Rosenberry, who chaired the redistricting commission which drafted the plan.  The new plan went into effect in the 1954 elections, after some additional wrangling and judicial arguments.  Under that plan, the 17th Senate district added Grant County to Green, Lafayette, and Iowa.

In the 1960s, the Legislature missed a court-imposed deadline to pass a redistricting plan after the 1960 U.S. Census.  The Wisconsin Supreme Court, therefore, enforced its own plan for legislative districts in a filing in State ex rel. Reynolds v. Zimmerman.  In the court-ordered plan, the 17th Senate district added Richland County to Grant, Green, Iowa, and Lafayette.

The district only changed slightly in the 1972 redistricting, the first to occur after the Supreme Court ruling requiring state legislative districts to offer equal representation.  The 17th district lost several towns of northwest Grant County, and gained parts of southwest Rock County and northwest Dane County.

In the 1981–1982 session, the Legislature again failed to pass a redistricting plan, and, as a result of litigation, a panel of three federal judges ordered a new districting plan in Wisconsin State AFL-CIO v. Elections Board.  Under the court-ordered plan, the 17th Senate district lost most of Richland County and northern Green County, and the parts of Dane County that had been added in 1972, it gained more of Rock County and part of southern Sauk County.  This court-ordered plan was only in-effect for the 1982 election; in 1983 the Legislature acted to override the court-ordered plan with their own plan for the remainder of the 1980s elections.  The 17th district regained all of Richland County and added most of Sauk County and part of southern Juneau County; it lost all of Green and Rock counties.

The 1992 redistricting was again ordered by a panel of judges, and this time was not superseded by a Legislative plan.  The 1992 plan saw the 17th district add all of Juneau and the remaining parts of Grant County, and losing much of Richland County.  The subsequent 2002 and 2011 maps vary in boundaries, but keep roughly this configuration, stretching from Grant to Juneau, with parts of Richland, Sauk, Iowa, and Lafayette counties.

Past senators
The boundaries of districts have changed over history. Previous politicians of a specific numbered district have represented different geographic areas, due to redistricting.

At statehood, the district was one of two for Racine County.
It was represented by:

References

External links
District Website
Senator Marklein's Website

Wisconsin State Senate districts
Grant County, Wisconsin
Lafayette County, Wisconsin
Iowa County, Wisconsin
Richland County, Wisconsin
Sauk County, Wisconsin
Monroe County, Wisconsin
Juneau County, Wisconsin
Green County, Wisconsin
Vernon County, Wisconsin
1848 establishments in Wisconsin